In the sport of rock climbing, The Mandala is a  high bouldering problem (a difficult but short climb completed without a rope) in the Buttermilks, a popular bouldering area near Bishop, California. It is one of the most widely known boulder problems in the world, and is graded .

History
The problem climbs a steep overhanging prow on a large granite boulder that for many decades was considered too difficult and futuristic to solve. In 2008,  Climbing magazine recounted a story from the 1970s where John Bachar and Ron Kauk reportedly joked the line would one day fall to John Gill's grandchildren, and describing it as a boulder that "to this day remains one of the most coveted and storied problems in American bouldering". 

It was first climbed by Chris Sharma in February 2000. Sharma's ascent received much acclaim in the climbing community, however, he did not assign the problem a grade. Since the first ascent, several holds have broken, including one of the crux holds. In 2002, Tony Lamiche completed the first flash of the route. In January 2008, Lisa Rands made the first female ascent, and in 2011, Alex Johnson made the second female ascent. Contemporary ascents are still covered in the climbing media.

Variations
In 2007, Jeff Silcox added a more intimidating direct finish (avoiding the left escape near the top of the prow), to create The Mandala Direct, still graded . Later in 2007, Paul Robinson, added the sit-down-start to Silcox's route, making the first ascent of The Mandala Direct Assis, graded .

Filmography
 Chris Sharma's first ascent:

See also
Midnight Lightning, famous  boulder in Camp 4 (Yosemite)
The Wheel of Life, famous  boulder in the Grampians, Australia

References

Climbing routes
Tourist attractions in Inyo County, California